Henry Cousins (February 7, 1827 – October  25, 1888) was an American lawyer and politician.

Cousins was born in Mayville, New York, where he received his education. He moved to Elyria, Ohio, and studied law. In 1848, Cousins was admitted to the Ohio bar. In 1850, Cousins moved to East Troy, Wisconsin, and continued to practice law. He moved to Eau Claire, Wisconsin, in 1866. In 1867, Cousins, a Republican, was elected district attorney for Eau Claire County, Wisconsin. Cousins served in the Wisconsin Assembly in 1871 and as a delegate to the Wisconsin Republican convention in 1873. He died at his home in Eau Claire, Wisconsin.

Notes

1827 births
1888 deaths
People from Elyria, Ohio
People from Mayville, New York
Politicians from Eau Claire, Wisconsin
Ohio lawyers
District attorneys in Wisconsin
Republican Party members of the Wisconsin State Assembly
People from East Troy, Wisconsin
19th-century American politicians
19th-century American lawyers